United Left (IU) is a federative political movement in Spain that was first organized as a coalition in 1986, bringing together several left-wing political organizations, most notably the Communist Party of Spain.

IU was founded as an electoral coalition of seven parties, but the Communist Party of Spain (PCE) is the only remaining integrated member of the IU at the national level. Despite that, IU brings together other regional parties, political organizations, and independents. It currently takes the form of a permanent federation of parties.
 IU is currently part of the Unidas Podemos coalition and the corresponding parliamentary group in the Congreso de los Diputados. Since January 2020, it participates for the first time in a national coalition government, with one minister.

History

Following the electoral failure of the PCE in the 1982 (from 10% to 4%), PCE leaders believed that the PCE alone could no longer effectively challenge the electoral hegemony of the Spanish Socialist Workers' Party (PSOE) on the left. With this premise, the PCE began developing closer relations with other left-wing groups, with the vision of forming a broad left coalition. IU slowly improved its results, reaching 9% in 1989 (1,800,000 votes) and nearly 11% in 1996 (2,600,000 votes). The founding organizations were: Communist Party of Spain, Progressive Federation, Communist Party of the Peoples of Spain, PASOC, Carlist Party, Humanist Party, Unitarian Candidacy of Workers, and Republican Left.

In contrast to the PCE prior to the formation of IU, which pursued a more moderate political course, the new IU adopted a more radical strategy and ideology of confrontation against the PSOE. IU generally opposed cooperating with the PSOE, and identified it as a "right-wing party", no different from the People's Party (PP).

After achieving poor results in the 1999 local and European elections, IU decided to adopt a more conciliatory attitude towards the PSOE, and agreed to sign an electoral pact with the PSOE for the upcoming general election in 2000. They also adopted a universal policy in favor of cooperating with the PSOE at local level.

Following the election of Cayo Lara as leader in 2008, however, the party has shifted back towards a more confrontational attitude towards the PSOE.

IU currently has around 70,000 members.

Member parties

Federations of IU
Andalusia: Izquierda Unida Los Verdes - Convocatoría por Andalucía (United Left/The Greens - Assembly for Andalusia)
Aragon: Izquierda Unida Aragón (United Left of Aragon)
Asturias: Izquierda Xunida de Asturies (United Left of Asturias)
Balearic Islands: Esquerra Unida de les Illes Balears (United Left of the Balearic Islands)
Canary Islands: Izquierda Unida Canaria (Canarian United Left)
Cantabria: Izquierda Unida de Cantabria (Cantabrian United Left)
Castilla-La Mancha: Izquierda Unida de Castilla-La Mancha (United Left of Castilla-La Mancha)
Catalonia: Esquerra Unida Catalunya (United Left Catalonia, Founded in July 2019; suspended in June 2019 Esquerra Unida i Alternativa)
Castilla y León: Izquierda Unida de Castilla y León (United Left of Castile and León)
Ceuta: Izquierda Unida de Ceuta (United Left of Ceuta)
Euskadi: Izquierda Unida - Los Verdes: Ezker Anitza (United Left - The Greens: Plural Left)
Extremadura: Izquierda Unida Extremadura (United Left Extremadura)
Galicia: Esquerda Unida (United Left of Galicia)
La Rioja: Izquierda Unida La Rioja (United Left-La Rioja)
Madrid: Izquierda Unida-Madrid (United Left-Madrid). Izquierda Unida de la Comunidad de Madrid (United Left of the Community of Madrid) was expelled in 2015. The new federation, IU-M, was created in 2016.
Melilla: Izquierda Unida - Federación de Melilla (United Left - Melilla Federation)
Murcia: Izquierda Unida-Verdes de la Región de Murcia (United Left - Greens of the Region of Murcia)
Navarra: Izquierda Unida de Navarra - Nafarroako Ezker Batua (United Left of Navarra)
Valencian Community: Esquerra Unida del País Valencià (United Left of the Valencian Country)

Leaders

Electoral performance

Cortes Generales

European Parliament

References

External links

Official website
Izquierda Unida Los Verdes - Convocatoría por Andalucía
Izquierda Unida Aragón
Izquierda Xunida d'Asturies
Izquierda Unida de Cantabria
Izquierda Unida - Izquierda de Castilla-La Mancha
Esquerda Unida-Izquierda Unida
Esquerra Unida de les Illes Balears
Izquierda Unida - La Rioja
Izquierda Unida de la Comunidad de Madrid
Izquierda Unida de Navarra - Nafarroako Ezker Batua
Esquerra Unida del País Valencià

 
International Meeting of Communist and Workers Parties
Unidas Podemos
Communist parties in Spain